Helen De Michiel (born November 28, 1953) is an American director, producer, media arts advocate, strategist and author whose work includes film, television, multimedia installation and digital transmedia.

Biography

As a producer, director and writer, her work includes the dramatic feature film Tarantella (1995, starring Mira Sorvino) that toured festivals worldwide and was broadcast nationally on the public television series Independent Lens in 1997. Her documentary: Turn Here Sweet Corn (1990) was broadcast on the PBS series POV in 1993 and continues to be in educational distribution for environmental organizers. As artist-in-residence, she has created participatory media installations, including The Listening Project (1994) for the Walker Art Center and Paying Attention (2003) for the Exploratorium in San Francisco. Her documentary, The Gender Chip Project (2006) was created in an innovative participatory process with a cohort of young women studying science, technology, engineering and mathematics, and is distributed by Women Make Movies. Her groundbreaking transmedia episodic documentary, Lunch Love Community (2014) documents the evolution of school lunch reform in Berkeley.

De Michiel was a member of the Peabody Awards Board of Jurors from 2001 to 2007.

Awards

De Michiel has received a fellowship from the Rockefeller Foundation and the Bush Foundation. An earlier video essay, Consider Anything, Only Don’t Cry (1988) received the "Best New Vision" Golden Gate Award at the 1989 San Francisco International Film Festival.

References

External links
Lunch Love Community
Turn Here Sweet Corn
Tarantella
The Listening Project

Living people
1953 births